Nafissatou Moussa Adamou (born 27 September 1997) is a Nigerien swimmer. She was born in Niamey, Niger's capital. She competed at the 2012 Summer Olympics in London. Adamou would not advance to the semifinals as the swimmer finished with a rank of 71.

References

External links

1997 births
Living people
People from Niamey
Nigerien female swimmers
Olympic swimmers of Niger
Swimmers at the 2012 Summer Olympics
20th-century Nigerien people
21st-century Nigerien people